Carl Robert Tielsch (1815–1882) was a German merchant who founded the Carl Tielsch & Co. Porcelain Manufactury.

Carl Tielsch & Co.
In 1845, encouraged by Carl Krister's results as a porcelain entrepreneur, Tielsch founded in 1845 in the locality of Altwasser (today Stary Zdrój, a district of Wałbrzych) founded, together with his partner Gideon von Wallenberg (a banker from Wrocław), the porcelain factory Carl Tielsch & Co.

In 1861, Tielsch was awarded the title of the Royal Trade Counsellor in acknowledgment of his contribution to the Silesian industry.

His son Egmont Tielsch became his successor.

The Tielsch factory is producing to the present day and is now called "Fabryka Porcelany Wałbrzych S.A.".

External links
PM&M, a short story of the Porcelain Manufactury.

1815 births
1882 deaths